Pakistan has a number of shrines that have become places of pilgrimage. They include mausolea and shrines of political leaders (of both pre-independence and post-independence Pakistan), shrines of religious leaders and pirs (saints) and shrines of leaders of various Islamic empires and dynasties.

Founding Fathers 

The mausoleum of Muhammad Ali Jinnah (Father of the Nation Quaid-e-Azam) in Karachi
The mausoleum of Allama Muhammad Iqbal (Poet of the Nation) in Lahore

Sufis saints and religious figures

Gallery

See also 
 List of mausolea
 Mausoleums of Multan

References 

Sufi shrines in Pakistan
History of Pakistan
Pakistani social culture

Mausoleums
Mausolea and shrines